London Conversation is the first album by John Martyn, released on Island Records in 1967.  Largely self-penned, the album is much more folk oriented than his blues/jazz tinged later releases.  Recording was completed by 9 August and the album was released when Martyn was 19 in October 1967. The album reputedly cost £158 to record. The cover photo was taken by Barry Wentzel on the roof of Island Records boss Chris Blackwell's flat in  Cromwell Road, London.

Track listing
All tracks composed by John Martyn except where indicated.

Side one
"Fairy Tale Lullaby" – 2:50
"Sandy Grey" (Robin Frederick) – 2:25
"London Conversation" (Martyn, Jon Sundell) – 2:42
"Ballad of an Elder Woman" – 2:43
"Cocain" (Traditional; arranged by Martyn) – 2:59
"Run Honey Run" – 2:37

Side two
"Back to Stay" – 3:28
"Rolling Home" – 5:43
"Who's Grown Up Now" – 4:01
"Golden Girl" – 2:34
"This Time" – 3:07
"Don't Think Twice" (Bob Dylan) – 4:11

Bonus track on 2005 CD reissue
"She Moved Through the Fair" (Traditional) – 2:33

Personnel
John Martyn - vocals, guitar, sitar, harmonica

References

External links
 The Official John Martyn Website
 

John Martyn albums
1967 debut albums
Albums produced by Chris Blackwell
Island Records albums